Dope House is an independent record label based in Houston, Texas.  It primarily releases  hardcore, underground, and Southern hip hop.

History 
Dope House Records was founded in 1995 by Carlos Coy (a.k.a. South Park Mexican) who released his debut album Hillwood that same year. By 1997, Dope House, (having signed artist's Rasheed, Low-G, and Pimpstress) started working on SPM's second album "Hustle Town". Dope House released SPM's second album in March 1998, that same year. Baby Beesh (now Baby Bash), joined the roster and they started to work on the next Dope House album "Power Moves: The Table" it was released on December 22, 1998. By 1999 Dope House Records was big and had eleven artists signed under them and all off them working on their debut albums, only available to record stores in Majority of the works released under the Playaz Lifestyle label are the Southern US region and online retail outlets. However, for a time in early 2000 Dope House teamed up with Universal Records to gain some commercial success.

Discography 
1995
South Park Mexican – Hillwood
1998
South Park Mexican – Hustle Town
South Park Mexican – Power Moves: The Table
1999
South Park Mexican – Latin Throne
South Park Mexican – The 3rd Wish: To Rock the World
2000
Lone Star Ridaz – Lone Star Ridaz
Lone Star Ridaz – Lone Star Ridaz (Screwed & Chopped)
Major Riley – The Untold Story
Rasheed – Let the Games Begin
South Park Mexican – The Purity Album
South Park Mexican – Time Is Money
Various Artists – Latin Throne 2
24/7 Hustlers – Walkin' on Water (Unreleased)
Hillwood Hustlaz – Wheel Watchers (Unreleased)
Low-G – Black Jack: No Love, No Peace (Unreleased)
Pimpstress – Most Valuable Player (Unreleased)
2001
Baby Beesh – Savage Dreams
Grimm – Before My Time
Lone Star Ridaz – Wanted
Lone Star Ridaz – Wanted (Chopped & Screwed)
South Park Mexican – Never Change
Various Artists – Screwston Vol. I: The Day Houston Died
Various Artists – Screwston Vol. II: Pink Soda
2002
Baby Beesh – Get Wiggy!
Baby Beesh – On Tha Cool
Juan Gotti – No Sett Trippin'''
Lone Star Ridaz – 40 Dayz/40 NightzLone Star Ridaz – Rules & Regulations (Unreleased)
Low-G & Rasheed – Wet BlackSouth Park Mexican – Reveille ParkTwin Beredaz – Twin BeredazVarious Artists – Screwston Vol. III: Stuck in da MudVarious Artists – Screwston Vol. IV: ScrewologistVarious Artists – Screwston Vol. V: Purple RainVarious Artists – Screwston Vol. VI: The World That Screw Build2003
Baby Beesh – The Ultimate CartelGrimm – The Brown RecluseJuan Gotti – El Mas Locote MixLucky Luciano – You Already KnowSouth Park Mexican – Hillwood & Hustle Town (Screwed & Chopped)
South Park Mexican – Reveille Park (Screwed & Chopped)
2004
Baby Bash – Ménage à TroisSouth Park Mexican – The 3rd Wish: To Rock the World (Screwed & Chopped)
2005
Lucky Luciano – The 4th Wish: To Sprinkle the World (Unreleased)
Rasheed – 21st CenturySouth Park Mexican – Power Moves: The Table (Screwed & Chopped)
Twin Beredaz – Twin Beredaz 2: Coast & Quota (Unreleased)
2006
South Park Mexican – When Devils Strike2007
South Park Mexican – Tha Purity Album II (Unreleased)
2008
South Park Mexican – The Last Chair Violinist2009
South Park Mexican – The Last Chair Violinist: Slowed 'n' Throwed (Unreleased)
2011
Various Artists – Dope City: Purest in the Game2014
South Park Mexican – The Son of NormaSouth Park Mexican –  48:
2018

• 2019
•South Park Mexican – The Devil's Mansion
• Carley Coy – My Father's Revenge
•2020

South Park Mexican – Telephone Road

•2021

•Baby Los – Some Things Never Change

Videography 
Mary-Go-Round
Latin Throne
Latin Throne 2

References

External links 
Official website

Hip hop record labels
American independent record labels
Record labels established in 1995
Gangsta rap record labels